Westende is a town in Flanders, one of the three regions of Belgium, and in the Flemish province of West Flanders. It lies on the Belgian coast, also called the Flemish coast.

Populated places in West Flanders
Sub-municipalities of Middelkerke